Niels Eiterer (born 1977), also known by his stage name Niels van Gogh, is a German DJ and producer from Augsburg. He is best known for his 1998 single "Pulverturm" which achieved gold in Belgium and South Africa and reached the Top 20 of French and Dutch Billboard charts.

Career

His style is progressive clubsound. Niels van Gogh started his career in 1994 and plays in Europe and all around the world, e.g. in Ireland, Belgium, the Netherlands, Spain, Austria, Hungary, Italy, Thailand, South Africa, France, Australia among others.

“Pulverturm” (1998) was his first release on Kosmo Records. It was a hit around the world, reached gold status in Belgium and South Africa and was placed among the Top 20 of the French and Dutch Billboard Charts. Therefore, having sold over 20,000 vinyl records in Germany, Niels van Gogh was awarded the “Discomaniac” at the 2000 German Dance Awards.

“Doppelgänger” was his second release on Kosmo Records.

In 2003, Niels van Gogh signed a contract with the label Media Records. On Media Records he released following tracks: “One Way Out”, “Don't Be Afraid of Tomorrow” and his first album No Way Out.

In 2007, Niels van Gogh released the single Pulverturm 2.0 in cooperation with Eniac. It peaked at rank 6 in the Finnish charts.

In 2008 he worked together with Thomas Gold and released another hit, a remix of "Silence" by Delerium and Sarah McLachlan.

In spring 2009, Niels van Gogh released his new Single "Dreamer" with the leading German dance music label Scream & Shout and also started his own label "Play Me Louder".

Discography

Charted singles

Other singles

Albums 
2004: No Way Out
2006: Frequenzklang
2007: The Remix Album
2008: All The Singles
2008: We Love Electro 
2009: We Love Electro II
2009: We Love Electro III
2010: We Love Electro IV
2010: We Love Electro V

References

External links 

 Official homepage
 Play me louder

German DJs
1977 births
Living people
Musicians from Augsburg
Place of birth missing (living people)
Electronic dance music DJs